Samuel William Smith (August 23, 1852 – June 19, 1931), was a politician from the U.S. state of Michigan.

He was born in Independence Township and attended the common schools in Clarkston and Detroit.  He began teaching school in 1869, served as superintendent of schools in Waterford Township in 1875 and also served as principal of the school at Waterford, Michigan.  He went on to study law, was admitted to the bar in 1877 and graduated from the law department of the University of Michigan at Ann Arbor in 1878.  He began legal practice in Pontiac, where for six months he worked alone with considerable success, and then formed a partnership with Judge Levi Taft and Hon. Aaron Perry. Judge Perry retired from the firm during the second year of the partnership, but the connection between Judge Taft and Mr. Smith continued until the death of the former in 1897. Smith was prosecuting attorney of Oakland County from 1880 to 1884.

He served in the Michigan Senate from 1885 to 1887, representing the 15th District. He was elected as a Republican from Michigan's 6th congressional district to the 55th United States Congress and to the eight succeeding Congresses, serving from March 4, 1897, to March 3, 1915. During his tenure, Smith was chairman of the Committee on the District of Columbia in the 60th and 61st Congresses. He did not stand for reelection to the 64th Congress, but moved to Detroit in 1913 and continued the practice of law. He died in Detroit and was buried in Oakwood Cemetery in Adrian, Michigan.

References

The Political Graveyard

1852 births
1931 deaths
Burials in Michigan
Republican Party Michigan state senators
People from Clarkston, Michigan
People from Waterford, Michigan
Republican Party members of the United States House of Representatives from Michigan
Schoolteachers from Michigan
University of Michigan Law School alumni
19th-century American educators
19th-century American lawyers
19th-century American politicians
20th-century American politicians